Cymbidium  may refer to:
 Cymbidium, the boat orchids, a plant genus in the family Orchidaceae
 Cymbidium (brachiopod), a Silurian brachiopod genus